Hernán Haddad Abdala (5 October 1928 – 9 May 2012) was a Chilean athlete. He competed in the men's discus throw at the 1952 Summer Olympics and the 1956 Summer Olympics.

References

1928 births
2012 deaths
Athletes (track and field) at the 1952 Summer Olympics
Athletes (track and field) at the 1956 Summer Olympics
Chilean male discus throwers
Olympic athletes of Chile
Place of birth missing
Pan American Games medalists in athletics (track and field)
Pan American Games bronze medalists for Chile
Athletes (track and field) at the 1951 Pan American Games
Athletes (track and field) at the 1955 Pan American Games
Athletes (track and field) at the 1959 Pan American Games
Medalists at the 1955 Pan American Games
20th-century Chilean people